Maud of Normandy (died 1006) was the daughter of Richard I "the Fearless", Duke of Normandy and Gunnor. Her siblings were Richard II "the Good", Duke of Normandy; Robert, Archbishop of Rouen, Count of Evreux;, Mauger, Count of Corbeil; Robert Danus; Emma of Normandy and Hawise of Normandy.

Maud was married to Odo II, Count of Blois but died young and without issue. After her death in 1006, Odo started a quarrel with his brother-in-law, Richard II of Normandy, over the dowry: part of the town of Dreux. King Robert II, who had married Odo's mother, imposed his arbitration on the contestants circa 1011, leaving Odo in possession of Dreux.

References

1006 deaths
House of Normandy
10th-century French people
11th-century French people
Medieval French nobility
10th-century French women
11th-century French women
Year of birth unknown